Chandler Municipal Airport  is in Maricopa County, Arizona, United States,  southeast of Chandler, which owns it. The National Plan of Integrated Airport Systems for 2011–2015 categorized it as a general aviation reliever airport.

Chandler Municipal is one of the nation’s 50 busiest general aviation airports. It adds to Arizona's economy by bringing in more than $53 million annually. No airlines operate out of Chandler and none plan to in the near future.

Most U.S. airports use the same three-letter location identifier for the FAA and IATA, but Chandler Municipal is CHD to the FAA and has no IATA code (IATA had assigned CHD to Phoenix-Mesa Gateway Airport in nearby Mesa, Arizona – since redesignated by the IATA as AZA).

Facilities 
It has two asphalt runways:

 4L/22R measuring 
 4R/22L measuring 

It has one concrete helipad:

 H1 measuring 

The airport has built and improved a heliport facility, airport signage, and aircraft parking space by 10 acres with 90 tie-down spaces. These improvements were made overhe six years and cost about $7 million. The privately owned parking spaces are at 100% capacity. Affiliated Property Management is the company/HOA that controls the privately owned hangars.

In the year ending April 25, 2011 the airport had 161,750 aircraft operations, average 443 per day: 98% general aviation, 2% air taxi, and <1% military. 333 aircraft were then based at the airport: 86% single-engine, 9% multi-engine, 3% helicopter, 1% jet, and 1% ultralight.

Operations data (takeoffs or landings):

 2004: 233,219
 2005: 227,150
 2006: 268,093
 2007: 260,636
 2008: 254,267
 2009: 205,771

2021 mid-air collision 

In 2021 a aerial collision between two aircraft over Chandler occurred. A Piper PA-28-181 Archer II on a training flight collided with a Robinson R22 near Phoenix. The crash occurred at 07:30 local time.

The Piper PA-28-181 Archer II landed safely with damage to its landing gear. The Robinson R22 crashed and burst into flames.

References

External links 
 Chandler Municipal Airport at City of Chandler website
 Chandler Municipal (CHD) at Arizona DOT airport directory
 Aerial image as of April 1997 from USGS The National Map
 Phoenix Flyers Flying Club
 
 

Airports in Maricopa County, Arizona
Transportation in Chandler, Arizona
Buildings and structures in Chandler, Arizona